Rob Yang is a Korean American actor known for his role as Lawrence Yee on Succession and as Logan Kim on The Resident. Yang has also appeared in numerous television shows and films, including The Americans,  Living with Yourself, and Twisted.

Filmography

Film

Television

Video games

References

External links 
https://m.imdb.com/name/nm2342888

American actors
American actors of Korean descent
Year of birth missing (living people)
Place of birth missing (living people)
Living people